Nobody's Looking is a Brazilian fantasy comedy streaming television series that premiered on Netflix on November 22, 2019.

Cast

Main
 Victor Lamoglia as Ulisses Angelus
 Kéfera Buchmann as Miriam Lopes Teixeira
 Júlia Rabello as Greta Angelus
 Augusto Madeira as Fred Angelus
 Danilo de Moura as Chun Angelus
 Leandro Ramos as Sandro Serra
 Telma de Souza as Wanda Angelus

Recurring
 Projota as Richard A. de Souza
 Sergio Pardal as Valdir "The Prophet" Soares
 Felipe Riquelme as Tobias Angelus
 Kevin Vechiatto as Querubim Angelus
 Eliana Gutmann as Cilene
 Fafá Rennó as Tânia
 Felipe de Carolis as Marcos Veloso

Episodes

Production
The series was cancelled after the first season.

Release
Nobody's Looking was released on 11 November 2019 on Netflix.

Awards

Notes

References

External links
 
 

2010s Brazilian television series
2010s comedy-drama television series
2019 Brazilian television series debuts
2019 Brazilian television series endings
Angels in television
Brazilian comedy television series
Brazilian drama television series
Brazilian fantasy television series
Fantasy comedy television series
Portuguese-language Netflix original programming
Television shows filmed in São Paulo (state)
Television shows set in São Paulo